Hugo Schuster (22 November 1886  – 10 July 1976) was a German-British actor.

Biography
Born in Aachen, Germany, Schuster began his career acting at Otto Brahm's Berlin Lessing Theater. In the 1920s, he acted in the leading German theatres. After 1945, he had roles in English theatre plays, films, television, and radio - such as the BBC German service. From 1956 to 1963 he lived in Germany, acting in German productions. However, he did not feel at peace in post-war Germany and returned to his home in Golders Green.

Personal life
Hugo married actress, Sybil Rares.

Filmography

References

External links 
 

1886 births
1976 deaths
British male film actors
German male film actors
German emigrants to the United Kingdom